Megachile labascens is a species of bee in the family Megachilidae. It was described by Theodore Dru Alison Cockerell in 1925.

References

Labascens
Insects described in 1925